Aleksandr Viktorovich Ivanovsky (November 29, 1881 – January 12, 1968) was a screenwriter and film director in Soviet Union. He was awarded the Stalin Prize in 1941, for his work on the 1940 film Musical Story. His 1944 operetta film Silva was one of the most popular releases in the Soviet Union that year.

Selected filmography 
 Comedienne (1923)
 The Palace and the Fortress (1924)
 The Decembrists (1927)
 House of Greed (1933)
 Dubrovsky (1936)
 Musical Story (1940)
 Spring Song (1941)
 Anton Ivanovich Is Angry (1941)
 Silva (1944)
 Russian Ballerina (1947)
 Tamer of Tigers (1955)

References

Bibliography 
 Spring, Derek & Taylor, Richard. Stalinism and Soviet Cinema. Routledge, 2013.

External links 
 

1881 births
1968 deaths
Mass media people from Kazan
Kazan Federal University alumni
Stalin Prize winners
Recipients of the Order of the Red Banner of Labour
Male screenwriters
Soviet film directors
Soviet male writers
Soviet screenwriters

Soviet theatre directors